Split Second is a 1953 American film noir thriller directed by Dick Powell about escaped convicts and their hostages holed up in a ghost town, unaware of the grave danger they are in. It features Stephen McNally, Alexis Smith, Jan Sterling, and Keith Andes. It was the only film put into production by the consortium that took over RKO Pictures in late 1952 before previous owner Howard Hughes resumed control of the company. Location shooting took place in the Mojave Desert.

Plot

Sam Hurley and Bart Moore escape from prison, although Moore is seriously wounded in the breakout. They commandeer a gas station, killing the attendant when he tries to disarm Hurley. They meet up with a confederate, a mute named "Dummy", and hide out in a ghost town. Along the way, they pick up several hostages, Kay Garven and her lover Arthur Ashton, reporter Larry Fleming, dancer Dorothy "Dottie" Vail, and the town's sole resident, Asa Tremaine. Sam calls Kay's husband, Neal, a doctor, and threatens to kill Kay if he does not come and help Bart.

Larry warns the gangsters that the government is going to conduct an atomic bomb test nearby the next morning, but Sam does not believe him. When Arthur causes trouble, Sam kills him without a qualm. To Kay's surprise, Neal still loves her enough to show up. He successfully operates on Bart, but warns Sam that moving his friend too soon will kill him. When Sam finally realizes that Larry was telling the truth, he still waits as long as possible to give Bart time to recuperate.

Unknown to everyone, the test has been moved ahead an hour due to favorable weather conditions. When the five-minute warning sounds earlier than expected, Sam and Bart hurry to Neal's car and a desperate Kay persuades Sam to take her along. Larry overpowers Dummy, but the others drive away. Asa leads Dottie, Larry, and Neal to safety in a nearby mine. Sam, Bart and Kay are killed by the explosion, but the others emerge unharmed.

Cast
 Stephen McNally as Sam Hurley
 Alexis Smith as Kay Garven
 Jan Sterling as Dorothy "Dottie" Vail
 Keith Andes as Larry Fleming
 Arthur Hunnicutt as Asa Tremaine
 Paul Kelly as Bart Moore
 Robert Paige as Arthur Ashton
 Richard Egan as Dr. Neal Garven
 Frank de Kova as Dummy

Victor Mature and Jane Russell were originally intended as the leads.

Critical reception
When the film was released, The New York Times film critic A. H. Weiler, while praising the cast, gave the film a mixed review, and at the same time encouraged first-time director Dick Powell. He wrote, "In making his directorial debut with Split Second, Dick Powell fortunately acquired a small but enthusiastic and competent cast, a fairly sturdy script and a contemporary peg on which to hang his melodrama ... Unfortunately, however, the pace at which this thriller moves is erratic and while its dénouement is spectacular it is hardly surprising. Split Second is a fairly taut adventure closely tied to the atomic age but it is rarely explosive ... Mr. Powell's initial directorial effort is not likely to startle the cinema world but it is a long step in the right direction."

More recently, film and DVD critic Jamie S. Rich also gave the film a lukewarm review, writing, "The film doesn't have much tension, despite the inherent drama of the scenario. The main reason for this is Hurley. He isn't written as being all that menacing. He's more the know-it-all pessimist who sees through everyone else's charade, rather than the scary murderer who plays mind games with his victims. He stirs up the pot some, but the juiciest stuff emerges all on its own ... the bulk of Split Second is essentially unremarkable. It's a serviceable lower-tier movie that moves at an efficient pace and provides mild entertainment."

Another modern reviewer, Craig Butler from AllMovie, was more positive: "Not as well known as it should be but a favorite of many who know it, Split Second is an incredibly tense film noir-cum-atomic bomb flick that marked an auspicious directorial debut for singer-actor Dick Powell ... Powell is aided in his efforts by the first rate black and white cinematography of Nick Musuraca ... The cast does not disappoint either, with fine work by all ..."

References

Bibliography
 Jewell, Richard B. Slow Fade to Black: The Decline of RKO Radio Pictures. University of California Press, 2016.

External links

 
 
 
 
 
 

1953 films
1950s thriller films
1953 directorial debut films
American black-and-white films
American thriller films
Film noir
Films about hostage takings
Films about kidnapping
Films about nuclear war and weapons
Films directed by Dick Powell
Films scored by Roy Webb
Films set in Nevada
Films with screenplays by Irving Wallace
RKO Pictures films
1950s English-language films
1950s American films